Kazem-e Mohammad (also Romanized as Kāz̧em-e Moḩammad) is a village in Ahudasht Rural District, Shavur District, Shush County, Khuzestan Province, Iran. At the 2006 census, its population was 381, in 52 families.

References 

Populated places in Shush County